Acrodontis is a genus of moths in the family Geometridae.

Species
 Acrodontis aenigma (Prout, 1914)
 Acrodontis fumosa (Prout, 1930)
 Acrodontis hunana Wehrli, 1936
 Acrodontis insularis Holloway, 1993
 Acrodontis kotschubeji Sheljuzhko, 1944
 Acrodontis tanchame Kobayashi, 1995
 Acrodontis tsinlingensis Beyer, 1958
 Acrodontis yazakii Kobayashi, 1995

References

External links

 

Boarmiini
Geometridae genera